Vietnamese nationalism is a form of nationalism that asserts the Vietnamese people are an independent nation and promotes cultural unity in Vietnam. It encompasses a broad range of ideas and sentiments harbored by the Vietnamese people for many centuries to preserve and defend the national identity of the Vietnamese nation.

Vietnamese is recognized as the only language in the country. Vietnamese nationalism focuses on the nation's military history, although there are cultural and civil aspects to it as well.

Some modern nationalist concepts in Vietnam focus on China, where anti-Chinese sentiment in Vietnam has been fueled in various forms, from the Vietnamese believing they were defending visages of Sinitic civilization from Manchus and Mongols during the Mongol invasions of Vietnam, or to promoting Baiyueism. Nationalism that promoted anti-French views has been prominent in the past. Vietnam's current socialist government-sponsored form is also regarded as a synthesis of nationalism and communism. 

Although within the East Asian cultural sphere, Vietnamese nationalism also affirms a Southeast Asian identity, in contrast to the general East Asian identity, which is seen to be more Northeast Asian.

History

Early Vietnamese and Chinese relations (111 BC – 19th century) 

During the age of the ancient states like Âu Lạc and Nanyue, nationalism among the population was weak, as there was no centralised Vietnamese nation. However, nationalism grew following the Chinese millennium in Vietnam. Several attempts against Chinese occupation resulted in many wars that happened throughout thousand years of Chinese rule, after which Vietnam finally regained independence in the 10th century following the battle of Bạch Đằng. Lý Thường Kiệt's famous declaration of Vietnam's independence, Nam quốc sơn hà (Mountains and Rivers of the Southern Country), is a patriotic and nationalistic poem that still lives on in Vietnamese society generations later. Nguyễn Trãi's Bình Ngô đại cáo is considered the other declaration of Vietnam's independence against the Chinese dynasties.

In the 17th century, in the North during the time of the Trịnh lords, the Trịnh mandated that the Chinese entering the country had to strictly follow Vietnamese customs and refrain from contacts with the local Vietnamese populace in the cities. However, in the south, the Nguyễn lords favoured the Chinese, allowing many Chinese to settle in new conquered land from the Khmer Kingdom. The immigrated Chinese scholars even became Nguyễn Lord officials. 

After defeating the Tay Son, the Nguyễn lord formed the Nguyen dynasty. The Nguyen dynasty completed the Vietnamese "March to the South" or Nam tiến. Over the span of 700 years, starting from the Lý dynasty, the dynasty gradually invaded and colonised the entire state of Champa and parts of the Khmer Empire. Under the Nguyễn dynasty (the dynasty most sinicised and influenced by the teachings of Confucius), they attempted to assimilate all of the ethnic minorities in the territories that they had captured by forcing them to adopt sinicised Vietnamese customs. Copying the Chinese idea of Central Plain, the Nguyễn dynasty saw themselves as belonging to a superior culture, unlike the Indianised states of Champa and the Khmer Empire. They saw themselves as carrying out a civilising mission against the minorities who were seen as barbarians. Considering themselves as superior due to being sinicised, members of the Vietnamese royalty looked down upon those that were non-Vietnamese as inferior.

Later on, after the Nguyễn dynasty began ruling Vietnam, the dynasty had been using the Vietnamisation concepts on the non-Vietnamese people. During the Nam tiến period of the Nguyễn dynasty, Emperor Gia Long stated that "Hán di hữu hạn" (漢夷有限, "the Vietnamese and the barbarians must have clear borders") when differentiating between Khmer and the Vietnamese. Emperor Minh Mạng, the son of Gia Long, stated with regards to the Vietnamese forcing the ethnic minorities to follow Sino-Vietnamese customs that "We must hope that their barbarian habits will be subconsciously dissipated, and that they will daily become more infected by Hán [Civilised] customs." The Nguyễn dynasty under that influence once saw themselves as "Hán nhân" (Civilised people).

Modern Vietnamese nationalism

Economy 
There has been a growing movement among Vietnamese by boycotting Chinese products, using Vietnamese-made products instead. This is called "made in Vietnam" to counter with "made in China".

Culture 
Despite being part of Sinosphere cultural influence and sharing many cultural aspects such as Confucianism, and having chữ Nôm and chữ Hán as its former writing script, Vietnamese nationalists mostly refuse to accept Chinese influence on Vietnam. They have a belief that the Vietnamese already had a profound culture before Chinese influence i.e Đông Sơn, rice cultivating, dominated by Austroasiatic peoples. Adding with the interactions and later conquests of Indianized Kingdom of Champa, Vietnamese nationalists believe it is a major cross-road of two civilizations rather than one, being at crossroads between Indic and Sinic.  

Vietnamese textbooks also refer to the influence of China but reject Chinese elements in Vietnamese nation. The current of north Vietnam was part of the land of Bai Yue tribes, so they believe the similarities are because of the Chinese culture was influenced by the culture of Bai Yue tribes (Bách Việt) when their land was conquered by the Han Chinese.

Military 
For much of its history being razed by wars, the Vietnam developed its nationalism based on its successful history of warfare. Many Vietnamese generals are seen as nationalistic heroes in Vietnamese society, such as Trần Hưng Đạo, the famous general who stood up to the mighty Mongol Empire by successfully repelling the three Mongol invasions of Vietnam in 1258, 1285, 1287–1288 and Nguyễn Huệ, a revered Emperor and general who defeated the Qing dynasty of China in the Battle of Ngọc Hồi-Đống Đa, considered to be one of the greatest military victories in Vietnamese history. Both Trần Hưng Đạo and Nguyễn Huệ have several streets named after them and statues erected to honor them, and both are listed as being among the greatest generals in history.

Vietnam also heavily honors its long lists of generals in ancient Vietnamese history that fought against Chinese expansionism, such as the Trưng Sisters and Lady Triệu, who were female generals that led major independent movements against Chinese occupation. Ngô Quyền is well honored for being the first to successfully defeat the Southern Han of China at the Battle of Bạch Đằng in 938 and establishing Vietnamese independence, Lê Hoàn for defeating the Song dynasty at the same river in 981, and Lê Lợi who liberated Vietnam by defeating the Ming dynasty and founding the Lê dynasty.

A sense of pride has also developed in the Vietnamese resistance in the 20th century. Ho Chi Minh is regarded as the founder of modern Vietnam after his victories against the Japanese during World War II and against the French in the First Indochina War, declaring the Democratic Republic of Vietnam. Võ Nguyên Giáp is also recognized as one of the most successful generals in current Vietnamese history, emerging victorious in not only the two aforementioned wars, but also in the Vietnam War, that allowed the unification of the country, and the Sino-Vietnamese War against the Chinese due to the Vietnamese invasion of Cambodia.

Education 
Vietnamese national pride is heavily promoted in Vietnamese textbooks, especially of its development and its heroism. Many Vietnamese stories are still heavily mentioned in the youth education system and among the older generations which have been regarded as a major factor that keeps Vietnamese nationalism alive.

Vietnamese irredentism 

The ideology of "Greater Vietnam" is a popular concept among some popular Vietnamese nationalist parties that claim the territory of Lưỡng Quảng (Guangxi and Guangdong), as well as Laos, Cambodia or territories of the ancient Baiyue as part of greater Vietnamese sovereignty. The idea is just a newly developed ideology following the beginning of 20th century, but has gained popularity in the aftermath of 2014 Vietnam anti-China protests.

According to Vietnamese nationalist groups, these territories have been traditionally Vietnamese until expansionism from foreign powers claimed them, and Vietnam must retake it. Because of this, Vietnam had carried a long-time conquests and conflicts with neighboring countries, as well as assimilations and even genocides due to its irredentist sentiment.

See also

References

Bibliography

Further reading
 
 

Dissertations

External links 

 
History of Vietnam
Politics of Vietnam